Ife East is a Local Government Area in Osun State, Nigeria. Its  headquarters are in the town of Oke Ogbo.

It has an area of 172 km and a population of 188,087 at the 2006 census.

The postal code of the area is 220.

References

.

Local Government Areas in Osun State